Gentiana clusii, commonly known as flower of the sweet-lady or Clusius' gentian, is a large-flowered, short-stemmed gentian, native to Europe. It is named after Carolus Clusius, one of the earliest botanists to study alpine flora.

Description
This species is very similar to Gentiana acaulis, but Gentiana clusii differs in the absence  of green stripes inside the corolla, by a more pointed shape of the corners between the petals, and preferring areas underlaid by limestone.

Distribution
In common with G. acaulis, Gentiana clusii is found in the Pyrenees, Alps, Apennines, Jura, Black Forest and the Carpathians. Seeds are available from commercial suppliers.

References

External links

clusii
Alpine flora
Flora of Europe
Flora of the Alps
Flora of the Pyrenees